Chris Dolan (born 1957, Glasgow, Scotland) is a Scottish novelist, poet, and playwright.

Career

Dolan has published four novels (Ascension Day, Redlegs, Potter's Field and Aliyyah), two collections of short stories and two non-fiction books. He has had three full-length stage plays produced internationally, with five shorter pieces and four collaborations with Spanish dramatists. He has written over 50 hours of television, and more of radio drama. He has worked in collaboration with visual artists on several pieces of public art, has published poems, broadcasts regularly and writes for Scottish and London newspapers.

Novels
Ascension Day (Headline Review, 1999) won the McKitterick First Novel Prize.
"…Dolan's post-industrial and post-imperialist Glasgow: "[s]uch quiet, modest little groupings of streets, yet their shadow stretched and fell for thousands of miles, as afar as Africa, India, America." This long-range view gives the novel great power, as Dolan draws his characters inexorably together, in the lost, once-great, city on the Clyde." – Christopher Hart, Scottish Review of Books.

Redlegs (Vagabond Voices, 2012)
"Good things come to those who wait, and this is a good thing… An engrossing and compelling novel... lingering richly in the memory… A fine novel" – The Scotsman.

Short stories
Poor Angels (Polygon, 1995) was shortlisted for the Saltire Prize, and included both the winning story for 1995 Scotland on Sunday / Macallan Prize (Sleet and Snow), and runner-up the following year (Year of the Vezzas).
"He holds you in a tight grip right from the start and manages to combine a sense of raw nostalgia with a profoundly moving atmosphere of love and loss." – Scotland on Sunday on Sleet and Snow.

Non-fiction titles
An Anarchist's Story: The Life of Ethel MacDonald (Birlinn 2009) 
"Dolan's book is both personal and universal." – The Scotsman.

Plays
His first play was The Veil (1991), Sabina (1998), The Reader (2000), and  The Angel's Share (2000).

Writing for screen and radio
Some of his work has appeared on the radio, including four original plays and many adaptations, including Umberto Eco's Name of the Rose, The Master of Ballantrae by Robert Louis Stevenson and several of Ian Rankin's Rebus novels. His four-part modern take on Strange Case of Dr Jekyll and Mr Hyde was broadcast in October 2012.

He has written for BBC Radio Scotland, BBC Radio 3, and BBC Radio 4. He has written such screenplays as Poor Angels and Ring of Truth as well as TV drama documentaries such as An Anarchist's Story: The Life of Ethel MacDonald and Barbado'ed both broadcast by BBC and Red Oil for Channel 4. He also has written extensively for Taggart, Take the High Road, Machair (TV series), and River City for which he has been writing since its inception.

Awards
2000: McKitterick Prize, Ascension Day
1999: Robert Louis Stevenson Memorial Award
1999: Macallan/Scotland on Sunday Short Story Competition, Year of the Vezzas
1999: Canongate Prize for Journalism
1996: Edinburgh Festival Fringe First, Sabina!
1995: Saltire Society Scottish First Book of the Year Award, Poor Angels and Other Stories, shortlist
1995: Macallan/Scotland on Sunday Short Story Competition, Sleet and Snow

Bibliography and other works

Fiction
Novels
 Aliyyah (Vagabond Voices, 2015)
 Potter's End (Vagabond Voices, 2014)
 Ascension Day (Hodder Headline Review, 1999)
 Redlegs (Vagabond Voices, 2012)
Short stories
 Hour After Hour (Pathfinder, 2008)
 Poor Angels (Polygon, 1996)

Non-Fiction
Books
 John Lennon, The Original Beatle. Biography (Argyll, 2011)
 An Anarchist's Story: The Life of Ethel MacDonald  (Birlinn, 2009)
Plays
 The Veil (1991)
 Sabina! (1995)
 3 Fallen Angels (1997)
 The Angels’ Share (2000)
 The Reader (2005)
 Leather Bound and Double Shot short plays for Play, Pie & Pint, series (2005/2006)
 Short Spin and Wheesht, Zarraberri and Limbo, all translations of plays for Play, Pie & Pint (2006)
 Hephaistos (2008)
 The Kist (2011)
Radio drama
 Sabina ! (BBC Radio 4, 2000)
 120 Rue de la Gare (adaptation of French thriller, BBC Radio 4, 2001)
 Of Love & Other Demons (Gabriel García Márquez novel, BBC Radio 3 2002)
 The Master of Ballantrae (adaptation of Robert Louis Stevenson's novel, BBC Radio 4, 2005)
 Mission to Marseilles (adaptation of French thriller, 2004)
 The Name of the Rose (adaptation of Umberto Eco's novel BBC Radio 4, 2006)
 The Observations (adaptation of a Jane Harris novel, Woman's Hour, 2007)
 The Tenderness of Wolves  (adaptation of Stef Penney novel, Woman's Hour, 2007)
 The Black Sheep (Honoré de Balzac, BBC Radio 4, 2008)
 Black and Blue (Ian Rankin Rebus adaptation, BBC Radio 4, 2008)
 The Dead Hour (adaptation of Denise Mina nove, 2009)
 Blue Water (original play for BBC Radio Scotland, 2009)
 Strip Jack (Rebus novel for BBC Radio 4, 2011)
 House of Mercy (co-written with Bruce Young, Woman's Hour, 2011)
 Dr. Hyde (original updating of Robert Louis Stevenson's classic, Radio Scotland, 2012)
 The Black Book (Rebus adaptation, 2012)
Television drama
 River City (BBC Scotland, 2004–)
 Taggart  (STV, 2004–2008)
 Burns – Alive & Kicking (6 dramas on Robert Burns, Channel 4, 1998)
 Machair (Gaelic serial drama, team writer, 1996–1998)
 High Road (STV, Resident writer 1992–1998)
 The X File(drama-docs on Scottish Democracy, Channel 4 1999–2000)
Film
 Poor Angels (1996)
 Ring of Truth (1998, BBC Scotland)
 Mistgate(1999)
Television, DOC
 An Anarchist's Story: The Life of Ethel MacDonald (writer, BBC drama documentary, 2007)
 Barbado’ed (writer, presenter, producer, doc BBC/TG4/RDF)
 Red Oil (co-writer, Mediaco/Channel 4 doc on Chavez’s Venezuela, 2009)
 Don Roberto (co-writer, Caledonia Films, BBC Scotland, 2008)
 Eurokids (writer and presenter, 3 series 1992–1995 of 6 programs each on young Europeans)
 Alba Na 70's (6-part series for STV 1993)
Radio Writer/presenter Inc’s
 Edge of the World (documentary series Radio Scotland, 2001)
 Cover Stories (writer and presenter, Radio Scotland’s weekly book programme, 2003–2005)
 Mingin’ (writer and presenter 60' doc. on sense of smell, Radio Scotland, 2002)
 Sunday Morning (writer and presenter doc on Scotland’s Sundays, 2003)
 Letter from Caribbean & Northern Arts (Radio 3 Interval Talks,  2002)
 The Last Communard (on French Revolution, BBC Radio Scotland, 2007)
 Lad o’Pairts (series on Scottish Education, Radio Scotland, 2003–2004)
 On The Shelf  (6 part series on Scots and their book collections, Radio Scotland, 2003)
 Fire! 60 (Hogmanay special on fire & light, Radio 4, 2003)
 The Last Tutor  (writer and presenter; 60” doc. Radio Scotland, 2004)
 The Real Macbeth (Radio Scotland, 5 part series, 2007)
Poetry
 Published in: Chapman, Mariscat. Scottish & Glasgow collections

Prizes

 Macallan/Scotland on Sunday Short Story Prize (1995; Finalist, 1998)
 Edinburgh Festival Fringe First (1996)
 Scottish Screenwriters' Award (1992)
 Robert Louis Stevenson Memorial Award (1999)
 Canongate Prize, for journalism (1999)
 Mckitterick,1st Novel Prize (2000)

References

External links
British Council Literature
 Chris Dolan Books from Scotland
 Barbados'ed 

1957 births
Living people
Writers from Glasgow
Scottish people of Irish descent
Scottish novelists
Scottish television writers